The 2013–14 QNB is the 5th edition of the league cup competition in Qatar. It started on 8 October 2013. 

It features 14 teams from the Qatar Stars League and this edition will see them divided into three groups, with the winner and  best runner-up advancing to the semi-finals. 

It is known as the QNB cup due to sponsorship by the QNB Group.

References

Qatari Stars Cup
Football competitions in Qatar
Qnb Cup, 2013-14
Qnb Cup